The first elections to the newly created Calderdale Metropolitan Borough Council were held on 10 May 1973, with the entirety of the 51 seat council — three seats for each of the 17 wards — up for vote. The Local Government Act 1972 stipulated that the elected members were to shadow and eventually take over from the predecessor corporation on 1 April 1974. The order in which the councillors were elected dictated their term serving, with third-place candidates serving two years and up for re-election in 1975, second-placed three years expiring in 1976 and 1st-placed five years until 1978.

As well as replacing the County Borough of Halifax, the new council included:

 Municipal Borough of Brighouse
 Municipal Borough of Todmorden
 Elland Urban District
 Hebden Royd Urban District
 Queensbury and Shelf Urban District (part)
 Ripponden Urban District
 Sowerby Bridge Urban District
 Hepton Rural District

The election resulted in Labour gaining control.

In May 1974 a by-election for the Brighouse ward occurred to replace the Conservative councillor G. Wood. The by-election was won by the Labour candidate M. Cunningham.

Council results

Council Composition
After the election the composition of the council was:

Ward results

Brighouse ward

Elland ward

Greetland and Stainland ward

Hebden Bridge ward

Illingworth ward

Lightcliffe ward

Mixenden ward

Northowram and Shelf ward

Ovenden ward

Rastrick ward

Ryburn ward

Skircoat ward

Sowerby North ward

St. John's ward

Todmorden ward

Town ward

Warley ward

By-elections between 1973 and 1975

Brighouse ward, 1974

References

1973 English local elections
1973
1970s in West Yorkshire